The 45th Daytime Creative Arts Emmy Awards ceremony, which honors the crafts behind American daytime television programming, were held at the Pasadena Civic Auditorium in Pasadena, California on April 27, 2018. The event was presented in conjunction with the 45th Daytime Emmy Awards by the National Academy of Television Arts and Sciences. The nominations were announced on March 21, 2018, during a live episode of CBS's The Talk.

Two new categories for digital drama series—Outstanding Writing in a Digital Drama Series and Outstanding Directing in a Digital Drama Series—were added this year. The Outstanding Guest Performer in a Digital Daytime Drama Series category was also split out from the Supporting Actress and Supporting Actor categories for digital drama series.

Winners and nominees

Winners are listed first, highlighted in boldface.

Performers

Crafts

Notes

References

045 Creative Arts
2017 television awards
2017 in American television